The Musée de l'Arles antique or Musée départemental Arles antique or Musée de l'Arles et de la Provence antiques is an archeological museum housed in a modern building designed and built in 1995 by the architect Henri Ciriani, at Arles in the Bouches-du-Rhône département of France.

Exhibits
The museum houses a large collection of antiquities, including monumental Roman sculptures from the local region. Among the exhibits is a model of the multiple overshot water mills which existed at Barbegal, and have been referred to as "the greatest known concentration of mechanical power in the ancient world".

The Arles Rhône 3, an ancient Roman boat discovered in 2011, is on display since 2013.

See also
Arles bust
Head of Arles
Musée Réattu
Museon Arlaten
List of museums in France

References

Buildings and structures in Arles
Archaeological museums in France
Local museums in France
Roman Arles
Museums in Bouches-du-Rhône
Museums of ancient Rome in France